The Rover 20 was a new medium sized car announced by Rover in June 1907. It was a production version of the car which won the Isle of Man Tourist Trophy Race in 1906. However artillery wood wheels were fitted instead of the (still recommended) wire wheels used in the race and the longer wheelbase allowed the engine to be kept out of the passenger area. The prototype's engine came back beneath the petrol tank.

With a few breaks Rover kept a premium 20 tax horsepower car in their catalogue until the outbreak of war in 1939. In the early 1950s an equivalent model returned to the market, the 2.6-litre Rover 90 and later Rover's 3-litre.

1907 model

Engine
The engine was very much based on the Rover 16's but the bore had been increased 2mm. There were a number of minor improvements. The water inlet pipe was now to the other side of the engine to provide better access to the valves and tappets. The oil  box (reservoir) was now at the left rear of the engine so a catcher for oil thrown up by the flywheel is no longer necessary. Lubrication pipes had been mounted lower. There was a new partition between sump and clutch housing so oil was not thrown to the clutch. Rover's engine braking system was fitted, it has the ability to close the engine's valves.

Gearbox

Brakes suspension steering

The chassis was suspended from the front axle at just one point by a pivoted transverse leaf spring which made no contribution to transverse stability and the whole car rested on just three points. Radius rods from the gearbox take up braking strains and act as distance stays for the back axle. The front end of these stays have buffer springs The foot brake is the contracting band type, the hand brake is of the pull-on internal expanding type. Both sets of brake are metal to metal. The action of the engine brake avoids much use of the conventional braking system. The rear springs attach by means of a spherical case clipping over a spherical turned part of the axle casing thus allowing a little motion due to bumps.

The chassis is built up from steel flitch plates over ash to give the necessary strength with flexibility.

Engine controls
A pair of Autoloc levers move over the top of the steering wheel. They operate the throttle and ignition. A pedal controls the engine braking system. Road tests as late as 1911 noted how Rover cars lacked accelerator pedals.

1930 Light Twenty
This car was fitted with a Rover Meteor 20 hp engine but otherwise was identical with the Rover Two-litre Sportsman's coupé

1933 Speed Twenty

1936 Speed Twenty

1939 Twenty

References

External links
 Tickford coupé 1940

1930s cars
20